The flag of the Cocos (Keeling) Islands was created in 2003 and adopted on 6 April 2004. It was designed by territory resident Mohammed Minkom, who won a design contest as a teenager.

Design
The flag consists of a green field, with a palm tree on a gold disc in the canton, a gold crescent moon in the centre of the flag and a gold southern cross in the fly. The palm tree represents the islands' tropical flora; the colours are Australia's national colours; the crescent represents Islam, the religion of the Cocos Malays who make up a majority of the islands' population; and the Southern Cross is a symbol of Australia and the Southern Hemisphere.

See also
 Flags depicting the Southern Cross
 Gallery of flags with crescents

References

External links

 Cocos (Keeling) Islands at Ausflag

2004 establishments in Australia
Cocos
Flags of the Cocos (Keeling) Islands
Flags of Australian states and territories
Southern Cross flags
Flags with star and crescent